Fiveways may refer to:

 Fiveways, Brighton, England, a road junction and locality 
 Normanby Fiveways, a road junction in the north of Brisbane, Australia 
 Woolloongabba Fiveways, a road junction in the south of Brisbane, Australia

See also
 Five Ways (disambiguation)